T.R. may refer to:

 Theodore Roosevelt, the 26th President of the United States
 T. Rajendar, Tamil film actor and director
 T. Ramachandran, Indian writer who wrote under these initials